The Joys of Living 2008–2010 is a compilation album by the British rock band Sharks, released 5 April 2011. It compiles tracks recorded during the band's first two years, including their Shallow Waters EP (2008), "Common Grounds" single (2009), and Show of Hands EP (2010), along with the new tracks "Sweet Harness" and "The Joys of Living". It serves as a debut for the band in the United States, where their prior releases were available only as imports. The album was released through the band's imprint Velvet Scene, a joint venture with Rise Records. The band supported the album by touring the United States with Social Distortion and Chuck Ragan in April and May 2011, and by playing the 2011 Warped Tour.

Reception

Matt Collar of Allmusic remarked that the songs on The Joys of Living 2008–2010 were in keeping with working-class pub rock bands of the 1970s such as The Stranglers and Dr. Feelgood, and with oi! bands like the Angelic Upstarts. He also remarked that some of the tracks "evince a kind of spiritual unity with such equally working-class but uniquely American artists as The Replacements and Bruce Springsteen. In that sense, Sharks stand their ground well against such similarly inclined contemporaries as The Gaslight Anthem and The Hold Steady." Alternative Press magazine wrote that "[t]hese 14 songs bristle with a wonderful sense of rock 'n' roll heritage that serves as a tribute to fallen heroes such as the Clash while simultaneously molding those influences into something refreshing and contemporary."

Track listing

Personnel

Band
James Mattock – lead vocals, guitar
Andrew Bayliss – guitar, backing vocals
Samuel Lister – drums
Cristian O'Reilly – bass guitar, backing vocals (tracks 1–9, 15–17)
Adam Lovelock – bass guitar, backing vocals (tracks 10–14)

Additional vocalists
Carl Murrihy – additional vocals on "The Joys of Living" and "It All Relates"
Spencer Pollard – spoken word on "Glove in Hand"

Production
Dan Weller – recording engineer, mix engineer, producer (tracks 1–9)
Joe Willes – recording engineer
Max Read – producer

References

2011 compilation albums
Rise Records albums
Sharks (band formed 2007) albums